In geometry, a hypersurface is a generalization of the concepts of hyperplane, plane curve, and surface. A hypersurface is a manifold or an algebraic variety of dimension , which is embedded in an ambient space of dimension , generally a Euclidean space, an affine space or a projective space.
Hypersurfaces share, with surfaces in a three-dimensional space, the property of being defined by a single implicit equation, at least locally (near every point), and sometimes globally.

A hypersurface in a (Euclidean, affine, or projective) space of dimension two is a plane curve. In a space of dimension three, it is a surface. 

For example, the equation

defines an algebraic hypersurface of dimension  in the Euclidean space of dimension . This hypersurface is also a smooth manifold, and is  called a hypersphere or an -sphere.

Smooth hypersurface

A hypersurface that is a smooth manifold is called a smooth hypersurface.

In , a smooth hypersurface is orientable. Every connected compact smooth hypersurface is a level set, and separates Rn into two connected components; this is related to the Jordan–Brouwer separation theorem.

Affine algebraic hypersurface 

An algebraic hypersurface is an algebraic variety that may be defined by a single implicit equation of the form

where  is a multivariate polynomial. Generally the polynomial is supposed to be irreducible. When this is not the case, the hypersurface is not an algebraic variety, but only an algebraic set. It may depend on the authors or the context whether a reducible polynomial defines a hypersurface. For avoiding ambiguity, the term irreducible hypersurface is often used. 

A hypersurface may have singularities, which are the common zeros, if any, of the defining polynomial and its partial derivatives. In particular, a real algebraic hypersurface is not necessarily a manifold.

Properties
Hypersurfaces have some specific properties that are not shared with other algebraic varieties. 

One of the main such properties is Hilbert's Nullstellensatz, which asserts that a hypersurface contains a given algebraic set if and only if the defining polynomial of the hypersurface has a power that belongs to the ideal generated by the defining polynomials of the algebraic set.

A corollary of this theorem is that, if two irreducible polynomials (or more generally two square-free polynomials) define the same hypersurface, then one is the product of the other by a nonzero constant.

This is the geometric interpretation of the fact that, in a polynomial ring over a field, the height of an ideal is 1 if and only if the ideal is a principal ideal. In the case of possibly reducible hypersurfaces, this result may be restated as follows: hypersurfaces are exactly the algebraic sets whose all irreducible components have dimension .

Real and rational points 
A real hypersurface is a hypersurface that is defined by a polynomial with real coefficients. In this case the algebraically closed field over which the points are defined is generally the field  of complex numbers. The real points of a real hypersurface are the points that belong to  The set of the real points of a real hypersurface is the real part of the hypersurface. Often, it is left to the context whether the term hypersurface refers to all points or only to the real part.

For example, the imaginary -sphere defined by the equation

is a real hypersurface without any real point, which is defined over the rational numbers. It has no rational point, but has many points that are rational over the Gaussian rationals.

Projective algebraic hypersurface

A  of dimension  in a projective space of dimension  over a field  is defined by a homogeneous polynomial  in  indeterminates. As usual,  means that all monomials of  have the same degree, or, equivalently that  for every constant , where  is the degree of the polynomial.

If one chooses the hyperplane of equation  as hyperplane at infinity, the complement of this hyperplane is an affine space, and the points of the projective hypersurface that belong to this affine space form an affine hypersurface of equation  Conversely, given an affine hypersurface of equation  it defines a projective hypersurface, called its , whose equation is obtained by homogenizing .
 

These two processes projective completion and restriction to an affine subspace are inverse one to the other. Therefore, an affine hypersurface and its projective completion have essentially the same properties, and are often considered as two points-of-view for the same hypersurface. 

However, it may occur that an affine hypersurface is nonsingular, while its projective completion has singular points. For example, the circular cylinder of equation 
 
in the affine space of dimension three has a unique singular point, which is at infinity, in the direction .

See also
 Affine sphere
 Coble hypersurface
 Dwork family
 Null hypersurface
 Polar hypersurface

References

 Shoshichi Kobayashi and Katsumi Nomizu (1969), Foundations of Differential Geometry Vol II, Wiley Interscience
 P.A. Simionescu & D. Beal (2004) Visualization of hypersurfaces and multivariable (objective) functions by partial globalization, The Visual Computer 20(10):665–81.

Algebraic geometry
Multi-dimensional geometry
Surfaces
Dimension theory